Little Sewickley Creek is a  long 3rd order tributary to Sewickley Creek in Westmoreland County, Pennsylvania.

Course
Little Sewickley Creek rises about 0.5 miles east of Lincoln Heights, Pennsylvania, and then flows west to join Sewickley Creek at Cowansburg, Pennsylvania.

Watershed
Little Seiwckley Creek drains  of area, receives about 40.7 in/year of precipitation, has a wetness index of 343.54, and is about 49% forested.

See also 
 List of rivers of Pennsylvania

References

 
Tributaries of the Ohio River
Rivers of Pennsylvania
Rivers of Westmoreland County, Pennsylvania
Allegheny Plateau